Lost a Lot of Blood is the second EP by Australian alternative rock band Horsell Common. The EP has a more melodic style than the band's previous EP, A Who's Who Road of Living.

A music video was made for "The Disaster", the band's second video (the first being the video for "In Theory").

Reception
A review at FasterLouder said Horsell Common "...have one up on the rest of the pack – their music comes across as a lot more genuine...the instrumentation is admirable from the three piece, with layered heavy guitars spiralling into tense breakdowns, backed by intermittent machine-gun drumming, and a rhythm section that occasionally belies the heavy direction of the music."

Track listing
 "The Disaster" - 3:54
 "Sentenced" - 3:12
 "This Modern Shame" - 3:53
 "Look Away" - 4:12
 "Dean Youngblood" - 3:50

Personnel
Mark Stewart - vocals, guitar
Luke Cripps - bass guitar
Leigh Pengelly - drums

References

2005 EPs
Horsell Common albums